Anil Jain (born 16 September 1942) is an Indian former cricketer. He played seven first-class matches for Delhi between 1961 and 1966.

See also
 List of Delhi cricketers

References

External links
 

1942 births
Living people
Indian cricketers
Delhi cricketers
Cricketers from Delhi